Kenn Borek Air is an airline based in Calgary, Alberta, Canada. It operates regional passenger and cargo services, contract operations in the Arctic and Antarctic and aircraft leasing. Its main base is at Calgary International Airport. It charters aircraft for scientific expeditions, oil exploration, etc., and operates air ambulance services.

History
The airline was established in 1966 as Vic Turner Ltd which operated a single de Havilland Canada DHC-6 Twin Otter providing air support for oil exploration activities in the Canadian Arctic. Renamed Kenn Borek Air after being purchased by Borek Construction in 1971, the company acquired the Aklavik Flying Services which was founded in April 1947 by Michael Zubko operating a single Aeronca Champion at that time. In 1975 Kenn Borek acquired Kenting Atlas Aviation which was established in 1947 as Atlas Aviation then renamed to Kenting Aviation in 1972.

The company has been operating in Antarctica since 1985.

On 26 April 2001, Kenn Borek Air used a DHC-6 Twin Otter aircraft to rescue Dr. Ronald Shemenski from the Amundsen–Scott South Pole Station. This was the first ever rescue from the South Pole during the southern winter. To achieve the range necessary for this flight, the Twin Otter was equipped with a special ferry tank.

In 2009, the company was commissioned to recover a crashed aircraft in the Antarctic, and employees spent 25 days in a makeshift camp to complete the project.

The airline was used by the BBC during the filming of the documentary Frozen Planet (2011), which was narrated by David Attenborough, and one of its planes is seen in portions of the footage.

In June 2016 the company assisted in removing two sick workers from Antarctica during the polar winter. Two Twin Otter aircraft were used and successfully completed the mission. The crew, captain Wally Dobchuk, first officer Sebastian Trudel and maintenance engineer Michael McCrae were honoured for their heroism by Aviation Week.

In 2020 one of the airline's converted DC-3s was used by NASA to drop probes along Greenland's Atlantic coast, as part of the NASA's annual Oceans Melting Greenland project. The project is intended to monitor the rate at which Greenland's ice cap melts into the sea.

Operations
Kenn Borek Air offers a full service overhaul maintenance hangar in Calgary with routine maintenance being completed wherever the aircraft is located.

Destinations

As of February 2023, Kenn Borek operates scheduled services to several communities in the Northwest Territories as Aklak Air:
Fort McPherson (Fort McPherson Airport only when the ice road is closed or the ferry is not in operation)
Inuvik (Inuvik (Mike Zubko) Airport)
Paulatuk (Paulatuk (Nora Aliqatchialuk Ruben) Airport)
Sachs Harbour (Sachs Harbour (David Nasogaluak Jr. Saaryuaq) Airport)
Ulukhaktok (Ulukhaktok/Holman Airport)

Fleet

As of February 2023, Kenn Borek Air has the following aircraft registered with Transport Canada.

Accidents and incidents
On 28 February 1977, Douglas C-47A C-FIQR crashed near Salluit (then known as Sugluk), Quebec. The aircraft was not repairable and was used for parts.
On 21 December 1977, DHC-6 C-FABW crashed near Nanisivik Airport, Nunavut. Damaged beyond repair. Two crew and six passengers were killed. Probable cause was a flap rod failure.
On 18 September 1978, Douglas C-47A C-FCRW was damaged beyond economic repair in a landing accident at Komakuk Beach, Yukon.
On 7 May 1982, Douglas C-47A C-FQHF overran the runway at Calgary International Airport following an aborted take-off. The aircraft was damaged beyond economic repair.
On 10 November 1987, DHC-4A Caribou aircraft C-GVYX, crashed near Ross River, Yukon, two crew were killed.
On 20 December 2007, Basler BT-67 C-FMKB was substantially damaged in a take-off accident at Mount Paterson, Antarctica when the take-off was attempted with insufficient speed for flight. Of the twelve people on board, only the co-pilot suffered minor injuries. Although both sets of undercarriage collapsed and the port wing was damaged, the aircraft was later repaired and returned to service.
One of the ten occupants on board was killed, four were seriously injured.
On 4 November 2010, a hangar fire at Inuvik (Mike Zubko) Airport destroyed three aircraft owned by Kenn Borek Air and operated by Aklak Air. They were de Havilland Canada DHC-6 Twin Otter C-GZVH, Beechcraft King Air C-GHOC and Beechcraft 99 C-FKBK.
On 23 January 2013, an Emergency Locator Transmitter (ELT) activated in Antarctica, in the Queen Alexandra Range. On board C-GKBC (c/n:650), the DHC-6 Twin Otter, that was equipped with skis, were three Canadians. The plane, operating under the auspices of the Italian National Agency for New Technologies, Energy and Sustainable Economic Development (ENEA), had been en route from the United States Amundsen–Scott South Pole Station to the Italian Zucchelli Station, located at  Terra Nova Bay. The aircraft was found on 25 January 2013. It had impacted Mount Elizabeth at the  level. The New Zealand helicopter rescue team which spotted the wreckage reported that the accident was not survivable.

References

External links 

Kenn Borek Air

Regional airlines of Alberta
Regional airlines of the Northwest Territories
Regional airlines of Nunavut
Airlines established in 1966
Seaplane operators